Roxboro-Pierrefonds  in the borough of Pierrefonds-Roxboro in Montreal, Quebec, Canada. is a future Réseau express métropolitain station, expected to open in 2024. It was operated by Exo in Montreal, Quebec, Canada. It was served by the Deux-Montagnes line. The station will be renamed to Pierrefonds-Roxboro when Réseau express métropolitain service commences, to match the name of the borough of Pierrefonds-Roxboro.

History 
The station was originally named Roxboro, and was built as part of Canadian Northern Railway's line from Montreal to Deux-Montagnes via the Mount Royal Tunnel. It handled passengers, mail, and freight. Roxboro Station burned down in 1932 and was not immediately rebuilt. This station was known as Ste-Genevieve. By 1944 the stop had returned to its original site and was once more known as Roxboro. The new, small station no longer handled freight.

Location 
The station is located in the former city of Roxboro in the Pierrefonds-Roxboro borough of Montreal, at 11100 Gouin Boulevard West. The platforms can also be accessed from the east where the line crosses Commercial Center (11th Avenue).

Connecting bus routes

References

External links 
  Roxboro-Pierrefonds Commuter Train Station Information (RTM)
  Roxboro-Pierrefonds Commuter Train Station Schedule (RTM)
 2016 STM System Map

Former Exo commuter rail stations
Pierrefonds-Roxboro
Railway stations in Canada opened in 1944
1944 establishments in Quebec
Réseau express métropolitain railway stations